Simon de Wit (born 19 April 1997), known professionally as Blanks, is a Dutch musician and YouTuber. He studied information science at the University of Groningen. He was awarded for "Best Artist" during Popgala Noord as part of Eurosonic Noorderslag in January 2020.

YouTube 
Blanks started his own YouTube channel under the name of Music by Blanks in 2013. He published several music and vlog videos on his YouTube channel. The channel currently has over 1 million subscribers.

Blanks' earliest videos were done in Dutch, but after his remake of Bazzi's "Mine" went viral in February 2018, he decided to switch fully to English. One of his current video formats is "Style Swap" where he remakes an existing song into an 80s-style track. Blanks' remake of Post Malone's "Better Now" became his biggest breakthrough.

Music career 
After doing cover videos for several years, Blanks started writing and producing his own music. His debut original single "Don’t Stop" was released in February 2019, and was added to the playlist of Dutch radio station NPO 3FM a few days after its release. Simon's second release, "Wave", was added to several radio stations abroad as well as the playlists of Dutch NPO Radio 2, NPO 3FM and became a "3FM Megahit". Blanks was also awarded for the 3FM's talent pool.

Blanks' single "What You Do to Me" was released on 12 February 2021.

Discography 
Studio albums
 Nothing Lasts Forever and That's OK (2021)
Extended plays
 Cheap Sodas and Ice Cream Kisses (2020)
Singles

References 

Dutch YouTubers
1997 births
Living people